Nutton is a surname. Notable people with the surname include:

 Dan Nutton (born 1996), Scottish rugby union player
 Micky Nutton (born 1959), English footballer
 Vivian Nutton (born 1943), British historian of medicine